Herrngiersdorf is a municipality in the district of Kelheim in Bavaria in Germany.
The village is dominated by the large, square Schloss Herrngiersdorf, a brewery.

Geography 
Herrngiersdorf is located south of Langquaid and consists of Herrngiersdorf, Sandsbach, Semerskirchen, and Sittelsdorf.

Gallery

References

Kelheim (district)